Dumitru Caraman (born 22 December 1944) is a Romanian former footballer who played as a midfielder. His son, Costin Caraman was also a footballer.

Honours
Portul Constanța
Divizia C: 1966–67

Notes

References

External links
Dumitru Caraman at Labtof.ro

1944 births
Living people
Romanian footballers
Association football midfielders
Liga I players
Liga II players
FCV Farul Constanța players
CS Portul Constanța players
AFC Dacia Unirea Brăila players
People from Constanța County